Hwang Jin Yi is a 2007 South Korean biographical drama film directed by Chang Yoon-hyun. Based on Hong Seok-jung's 2002 novel Hwangjini (which won the Manhae Prize for Literature in 2004), the film is about the life of Hwang Jin-yi, the most famous courtesan (or "gisaeng") in Korean history, starring Song Hye-kyo in the title role.

Plot
Raised as an aristocrat in 16th century Joseon, an era when class status dictated one's destiny, Hwang Jin-yi discovers a shocking secret about her birth: she was born illegitimate. She therefore belongs to the lower class, and has no recourse but to give up her aristocratic status. Before embarking on the life of a gisaeng, she decides to give up her virginity to a man of her own choosing, and spends her first night with Nomi, a long-time family servant, whom she is aware loves her deeply. As a gisaeng, Jin-yi becomes celebrated for her legendary beauty, wit, and talents in singing, dancing and poetry. But although she is surrounded by an entourage of noblemen showering her with gifts and admiration, she lives a solitary life of tragic isolation. Jin-yi's only solace is the game she and the local governor play on her noble clients, tricking them into exposing their hypocrisies. But when a bandit leader matching Nomi's description is spotted in the region, Jin-yi begins to question the life she endures.

Cast
 Song Hye-kyo - Hwang Jin-yi
Kim Yoo-jung - young Hwang Jin-yi
 Yoo Ji-tae - Nomi
Lee Hyun-woo - young Nomi
 Ryu Seung-ryong - Hee-yeol
 Youn Yuh-jung - old woman
 Oh Tae-kyung - Gwiddongi
 Jeong Yu-mi - Yi-geum
 Ye Soo-jung - Hwang Jin-yi's mother
 Jo Seung-yeon - Byeok Kye-soo
 Kim Eung-soo - Seo Gyung-deok
 Kim Boo-seon - Jang-deok
 Song Min-ji - Mae-hyang
 Park Cheol-ho - nobleman Hwang
 Lee Kwang-hee - servant of nobleman Hwang
 Kim Hyun-ah - gisaeng
 Tae-won - nobleman Kim
 Park No-shik - Choi Joo-boo
 Jo Kyung-hoon - public officer
 Choi Ji-na - Hyun-geum
 Bae Yong-geun - nobleman
 Min Bok-gi - Ho-jang
 Lee Mi-so - Hwang Jin-yi's female servant

Box office
Hwang Jin Yi was highly anticipated due to the star power of Song Hye-kyo, and many expected the film to be a box office hit. It received 1,270,644 admissions nationwide; however, due to its  budget, it was not enough for the producers to turn a profit.

Awards and nominations
2007 Chunsa Film Art Awards
 Best Lighting - Im Jae-young
 Technical Award - Jung Ku-ho

2007 Blue Dragon Film Awards
 Best Lighting - Im Jae-young
 Nomination - Best Actress - Song Hye-kyo
 Nomination - Best Cinematography - Choi Young-taek
 Nomination - Best Art Direction - Kim Jin-cheol, Jung Ku-ho
 Nomination - Technical Award - Jung Ku-ho, Jeong Jeong-eun (Costume Design)

2007 Korean Film Awards
 Best New Actress - Song Hye-kyo
 Nomination - Best New Actor - Ryu Seung-ryong
 Nomination - Best Cinematography - Choi Young-taek
 Nomination - Best Art Direction - Kim Jin-cheol, Jung Ku-ho
 Nomination - Best Music - Won Il

2008 Grand Bell Awards
 Best Costume Design - Jeong Jeong-eun
 Best Music - Won Il
 Nomination - Best Art Direction - Kim Jin-cheol, Jung Ku-ho
 Nomination - Best Lighting - Im Jae-young

See also
 Hwang Jini (TV series)
 Eoudong

References

External links
 
 
 

2007 films
South Korean biographical drama films
Films set in the 16th century
Films set in the Joseon dynasty
Films based on Korean novels
Films directed by Chang Yoon-hyun
Cinema Service films
2000s Korean-language films
South Korean historical drama films
2000s South Korean films